Lieutenant-Colonel Sir Ronald Deane Ross, 2nd Baronet  (13 July 1888 – 31 January 1958) was an Ulster Unionist Northern Irish Member of Parliament (MP).

He was the only son of Sir John Ross, 1st Baronet, the last judge to hold the office of Lord Chancellor of Ireland, and Katherine Mary Jeffcock. He succeeded to the title on his father's death in 1935.

Military career
Ross was commissioned into the North Irish Horse on 21 June 1907 as a second lieutenant, and was promoted to lieutenant on 23 April 1912.

He served in the First World War with the North Irish Horse. He was promoted to captain on 12 December 1914, and later to major. He was awarded the Military Cross. He resigned his commission in 1938, but rejoined his regiment in 1939 and served in the Second World War, reaching the rank of lieutenant-colonel. He transferred to the Royal Inniskilling Fusiliers in 1947 and retired in 1950.

Ross is best remembered as The 'One Man Regiment' from 1934 to 1938, when he was the sole member of the North Irish Horse, a squadron-sized yeomanry regiment.

Political career

Ross stood unsuccessfully against Sidney Webb as the Conservative candidate in the Seaham constituency of County Durham in the 
General Election 1923 and the October 1924 General Election. He was elected unopposed to the British Parliament in 1929 in a byelection for the Londonderry constituency, a seat once held by his father. He was re-elected unopposed for the same constituency in 1931 and 1935. He was returned again in 1945 and again in 1950 with majorities of 50.75% and 62.59% respectively, before resigning his seat in 1951, triggering an uncontested by-election which was won by the Ulster Unionist Party.

Personal life
His wife was Lady Dorothy Evelyn Francis Ross. It is not clear if they had any children (see NPG).

He died in 1958, aged 69.

Arms

References

External links
 Election history for Ronald Deane Ross
 NPG.org

1888 births
1968 deaths
British Militia officers
Royal Inniskilling Fusiliers officers
British Army personnel of World War I
British Army personnel of World War II
Baronets in the Baronetage of the United Kingdom
Ulster Unionist Party members of the House of Commons of the United Kingdom
Recipients of the Military Cross
North Irish Horse officers
Members of the Parliament of the United Kingdom for County Londonderry constituencies (since 1922)
UK MPs 1929–1931
UK MPs 1931–1935
UK MPs 1935–1945
UK MPs 1945–1950
UK MPs 1950–1951